Mado Gashi (also Modogashe) is a small remote town in Kenya. There are no large cities near Mado Gashi. It is connected by road to Isiolo (175 km west), Wajir (155 km northwest) and Garissa (155 km south). Mado Gashi has an unpaved airstrip. The village of Garba Tula is located 75 km west of Mado Gashi.
Residential areas in Mado Gashi are called Bulas. 
Bula Market, Bula Digs and Bula Jua are among big Bulas found in Mado Gashi.

Administratively the area is divided into two adjacent locations named Modogashe, one in Modogashe division Garissa County, Northeastern Province the other in Sericho Division of Isiolo County, Eastern Province. These locations are part of the Lagdera Constituency and Isiolo North Constituency, respectively.

References 

Populated places in Isiolo County
Populated places in Garissa County